The following is an episode list for the MTV television series Rob & Big. The show follows the lives of professional skateboarder Rob Dyrdek and his best friend and bodyguard Christopher "Big Black" Boykin. The series premiered on November 2, 2006, and featured eight episodes in each of its first and second seasons and sixteen episodes in the concluding third season. Along with the regular episodes, the series feature three recap specials.

Series overview

Episodes

Season 1 (2006)

Season 2 (2007)

Season 3 (2008)

Specials

References

Rob and Big